Other Asians is an ethnic classification within the United Kingdom and has been used within the 2021 census to describe individuals who self-identify as a corresponding Asian ethnicity but do not fall under the largest four being British Indians, British Pakistanis, British Bangladeshis and British Chinese.

The category itself is a not a single group, rather a collection of a wide range of ethnicities who come from a variety countries of birth and have a variety of languages and religions.

In 2021, they had a total population of 972,783 in England and Wales corresponding to 1.6% of the population, an increase from 835,720 in 2011.

Demographics 
The Other Asian population is largely of working age.

Birthplace 
In 2001, 1 in every 4 Other Asians originated from Sri Lanka.

Religion

Detailed breakdown

See also 

 Sri Lankians in the United Kingdom
 Afghans in the United Kingdom
 Filipinos in the United Kingdom

References 

Ethnic groups in the United Kingdom